Mitsutaka Kusakabe (born 10 November 1968) is a Japanese professional golfer.

Kusakabe played on the Japan Golf Tour, winning three times.

Professional wins (3)

Japan Golf Tour wins (3)

Team appearances
World Cup (representing Japan): 1998

External links

Japanese male golfers
Japan Golf Tour golfers
Sportspeople from Kanagawa Prefecture
1968 births
Living people